The France women's national rugby league team, also known as the Chanticleers ( for the Anglophone media)  or locally as  Les Tricolores, represents France in women's rugby league. They are administered by the French Rugby League Federation.

Players
Squad for the 2021 Women's Rugby League World Cup, held in October and November 2022.
Table last updated 7 November 2022, after the Round 2 match against Australia. Players' ages are as at that date.

Notes:
 Tally of participating players and points known for France women's rugby league international matches from 2010 onwards. Consequently, the tally for Alice Varela (15 matches) does not include potential appearances in the 2008 World Cup (up to 5 matches) and matches against England, one in July 2008 and two in July 2009. Verela's profile notes her debut in 2008.

Results

Full internationals 

Upcoming Fixtures: 
 England v France on 29 April 2023 at Halliwell Jones Stadium, Warrington

Tour / Trial / Warm-Up Matches 
This list is perhaps incomplete. It might be missing matches against Great Britain Under 21 team played between 2000 and 2007.

See also

France national rugby league team
Rugby league in France

References

External links

 

R
Women's national rugby league teams